Grasplatz (grass place) is a defunct railway station in the south of Namibia on the  decommissioned Aus–Lüderitz line. It is the place where in 1908 railway worker Zacharias Lewala found the first diamond in German South-West Africa and handed it over to his foreman August Stauch. Stauch's subsequent investigation triggered a diamond rush.

The place was originally called Grasabladeplatz (grass offload point) because here, before the railway was in place, alfalfa was stored to feed oxen before the ox wagons set off through the waterless Namib.

References

Railway stations in Namibia
German South West Africa
TransNamib Railway
Buildings and structures in ǁKaras Region